The 1992 Chattanooga Moccasins football team represented the University of Tennessee at Chattanooga  as a member of the Southern Conference (SoCon)in the 1992 NCAA Division I-AA football season. The Mocs were led by ninth-year head coach Buddy Nix and played their home games at Chamberlain Field. They finished the season 2–9 overall and 0–7 in SoCon play to place eighth.

Schedule

References

Chattanooga
Chattanooga Mocs football seasons
Chattanooga Moccasins football